Pedro Jeampierre Vite Uca (born 9 March 2002) is an Ecuadorian professional footballer who plays as an attacking midfielder for Vancouver Whitecaps FC in Major League Soccer.

Career

Independiente del Valle
Vite came up through the youth system at Independiente del Valle, going on to help the team win the U-20 Copa Libertadores in 2020. He made his professional debut for Independiente's reserve team, Independiente Juniors, in 2019 in the Ecuadorian Serie B. In 2021, Vite played his first season in the Ecuadorian Serie A, scoring two goals and tallying four assists in 14 appearances. He also played one match in the Supercopa Ecuador, and made ten appearances in the Copa Libertadores, scoring one goal and registering two assists across the tournament.

Vancouver Whitecaps FC
On 5 August 2021, Vite signed with Major League Soccer side Vancouver Whitecaps FC.

References

External links
 

2002 births
Living people
Association football midfielders
Ecuadorian footballers
Ecuadorian expatriate footballers
Expatriate soccer players in Canada
Ecuadorian Serie A players
Ecuadorian Serie B players
C.S.D. Independiente del Valle footballers
Vancouver Whitecaps FC players
People from Babahoyo
Major League Soccer players
MLS Next Pro players